was a long-running prime-time  popular television detective series in Japan. It aired on Saturday nights in the 9:00–9:54 p.m. time slot on the Tokyo Broadcasting System (TBS) network from May 24, 1975 to April 3, 1982. A sequel, G-Men '82, followed, as did the specials. It had also been broadcast in Hong Kong and Taiwan. Since Hong Kong was one of the filming locations, it was very popular there. With several updates and cast changes, it ran for 7 years. Selected episodes are available on DVD.

Plot 
The story revolved around a special detective agency, the eponymous G-Men. The principal character, who spanned the entire series (and continued into the sequel and specials), was Superintendent Tetsuya Kuroki, who was portrayed by Tetsurō Tamba. Kuroki directed the members of the group.

The original cast also included Yasuaki Kurata as Detective Yasuaki Kusano, trained in karate. Gō Wakabayashi joined in Episode 105, and remained to the end of the series (and the sequel). His character, Lieutenant Goro Tachibana, replaced a detective who was written out of the script.

Music 
Shunsuke Kikuchi wrote the opening theme songs. Various artists, including some cast members, wrote and performed the closing songs. For most years, the lyrics were by Junya Sato, set to Kikuchi's music. Veteran announcer Takayuki Akutagawa narrated the series.

Ending songs 

"Omokage" by Yuri Shimazaki (Episode 1-58)
"Tsuiso"  by Yuri Shimazaki (Episode 59-144)
"Michi" by Kaori Shima (Episode 145-174)
"Omokage" by Yuri Shimazaki (Episode 175-204)
"Requiem" by Isao Sasaki (Episode 205-229)
"Requiem" by Yuri Shimazaki (Episode 230-233, 235)
"Wing" by Mari Natsuki (Episode 234, 236-248)
"Harukanaru Tabiji" by Popla (Episode 254-306)
"Again" by Yuri Shimazaki (Episode 307-354)

Opening sequence
The opening sequence featured the main cast walking along a runway with a "75" placed at the bottom, with an arrow beside it, as their characters were viewed in separate close-ups (with the name of their actors accompanying). The placement of the arrow and the "75" logo were changed as the series progressed. It was intended to film the opening at Haneda Airport, but permission was not granted, so it was filmed instead at Yashio, a district of Tokyo's Shinagawa ward, and later openings at the JMSDF Tateyama Air Base.

G-Men '75 cast
Tetsurō Tamba as Tetsuya Kuroki (ep.1-355)
Yosuke Natsuki as Noriyuki Odagiri (ep.1-223)
Yasuaki Kurata as Yasuaki Kusano (ep.1-202)
Yū Fujiki as Hachibe Yamada (ep.1-204)
Daijirō Harada as Ichiro Sekiya (ep.1-33)
Fujita Okamoto as Shinichi Tsusaka (ep.1-104)
Mihoko Fujita as Keiko Hibiki (ep.1-103)
Gō Wakabayashi as Gorō Tachibana (ep.101-355)
Maria Mori as Ryoko Hayami (ep.105-203)
Gō Ibuki as Takeshi Nakaya (ep.105-306)
Mari Natsuki as Keiko Tsugawa (ep.205-251)
Hiroshi Chiba as Akio Taguchi (ep.205-330)
Toshihiko Yuuki as Tatsuya Murai (ep.205-226)
Yūsuke Kawazu as Yoshiaki Nagumo (ep.227-305)
Hiroshi Miyauchi as Kazuhiko Shimaya (ep.227-306)
Harumi Nakajima as Kyoko Fubuki (ep.253-306)
Takeshi Kaga as Shigeru Kusaka (ep.307-355)
Kyoko Enami as Saeko Tsumura (ep.307-355)
Bunjaku Han as Yoko Kagawa (ep.307-355)
Sarah Lowell as Mariko Teraoka (ep.307-330)
Masahiko Tanimura as Hajime Furuta (ep.331-355)
Kiyohiko Fujikawa as Daichi Kazama (ep.331-355)

G-Men '82 cast
Tetsurō Tamba as Tetsuya Kuroki
Gō Wakabayashi as Gorō Tachibana
Kyoko Enami as Saeko Tsumura
Bunjaku Han as Yoko Kagawa
Saburō Shinoda as Hayasaka
Kentaro Shimizu as Sawada
Koichi Miura as Shima

TV specials 

G-Men '75 Haru Dai Ikyou Satsujin no Onna (1993) Tetsuro Tamba, Masatoshi Nakamura, Mari Natsuki, Show Aikawa
G-Men '75 Special Kaettekita Wakashishitachi (2000) Tetsuro Tamba, Nenji Kobayashi, Junichi Haruta
G-Men '75 Special Tokyo-Hokkaido Trick Satsujinjiken (2000)  Tetsuro Tamba, Nenji Kobayashi, Junichi Haruta, Raita Ryū

References

External links
DVD Selection from Toei

Japanese National Bibliography 音楽録音・映像資料の部 (Audio recordings and film materials)

Japanese detective television drama series
1975 Japanese television series debuts
1982 Japanese television series endings
Japanese drama television series
Shunsuke Kikuchi
Detective television series
Japanese crime television series